Silesia football team is an informal regional football team made up of players from football clubs located in Silesia, under the auspices of the Silesian Football Association. It is not affiliated to FIFA, and does not play in official international matches.

Matches Silesia vs Poland

Matches Silesia vs other national football teams

Note: This is not a full list!

Other matches

Silesian dream team 
Although Silesia was never independently affiliated with FIFA, it is a place of origin of many notable football players playing mostly for the Germany, Poland and Czech Republic national teams. In 2010, the following hypothetical "dream" Silesian team was presented of the current players of Silesian background:  Raphael Schäfer, Marek Jankulovski, Kamil Glik, Tomas Ujfalusi (born in Rýmařov, a town in Bruntál District in the Moravian-Silesian Region which is not in Silesia), Łukasz Piszczek, Adam Matuszczyk, Libor Sionko, Sebastian Tyrała, Lukas Podolski, Ireneusz Jeleń, Miroslav Klose.

Since then, other prominent Silesian players who have appeared for the full Poland team include Łukasz Skorupski, Tomasz Jodłowiec, Jakub Błaszczykowski, Piotr Ćwielong, Arkadiusz Milik and Artur Sobiech. Mario Lička, Tomáš Vaclík and Michal Papadopoulos have been capped by the Czech Republic.

Notable Players 
Silesian footballers who represented FIFA national teams.
 Players in bold have won the FIFA World Cup
 Players in underlined have won a continental championships
 Players in italics have won the gold medal at the Olympic Games

Women's internationals

References

External links
Silesian Football Association page
List of matches in Roon Ba

Football
European national and official selection-teams not affiliated to FIFA
Football